The blind mole-rats, also known as the fossorial or subterranean mole rats, are a subfamily (Spalacinae) of rodents in the family Spalacidae, found in eastern Europe and western & central Asia. The hystricognath mole-rats of the family Bathyergidae are completely unrelated, but some other forms are also in the family Spalacidae. Zokors (subfamily Myospalacinae), root rats, and bamboo rats (subfamily Rhizomyinae) are spalacids also sometimes referred to as mole rats.

Blind mole-rats are in the family Spalacidae, but are unique enough to be given a separate subfamily, Spalacinae. Alternate opinions on taxonomy consider the blind mole-rats to be the only members of the family Spalacidae and rank other spalacid subfamilies as full families.  Other authors group all members of the superfamily Muroidea into a single family, Muridae. The Spalacinae contains two genera and eight species.  Some authorities treat all species as belonging to a single genus, Spalax, but more recent studies indicate a deep divergence between both lineages dating back to the Late Miocene, supporting them as being distinct genera.

Spalacinae mole-rats are truly blind.  Their very small eyes are completely covered by a layer of skin. Unlike many other fossorial rodents, blind mole-rats do not have enlarged front claws and do not appear to use their forearms as a primary digging tool. Digging is almost exclusively conducted using their powerful front teeth, which are separated from the rest of the mouth by a flap of skin. When a blind mole-rat closes its mouth, its incisors are still on the outside. Blind mole-rats may have evolved from spalacids that used their front limbs to dig, because their olecranon processes are large relative to the rest of their arms.  The olecranon process is a part of the ulna bone where muscles attach, and digging animals tend to have enlarged olecranon processes to provide a large surface for their large and powerful muscles to attach.

Because they are completely blind, blind mole-rats have been important laboratory animals in tests on how eyes and eye proteins function. Although blind mole-rats have only atrophied subcutaneous eyes and are sightless, their circadian rhythm is kept. A few publications, such as Avivi et al., 2002, have proven that the circadian genes that control the biological clock are expressed in a similar manner as in sighted, above-ground mammals.

Classification 

 Subfamily Spalacinae - blind mole-rats
 Genus Spalax
 Mehely's blind mole-rat, S. antiquus
 Sandy blind mole-rat, S. arenarius
 Giant blind mole-rat, S. giganteus
 Bukovina blind mole-rat, S. graecus
 Oltenia blind mole-rat, S. istricus (possibly extinct)
 Greater blind mole-rat, S. microphthalmus
 Kazakhstan blind mole-rat, S. uralensis
 Podolsk blind mole-rat, S. zemni
 Genus Nannospalax - small-bodied mole-rats
 Subgenus Nannospalax
 Middle East blind mole-rat or Palestine mole-rat, N. ehrenbergi
 Subgenus Mesospalax
 Lesser blind mole-rat, N. leucodon
 Anatolian blind mole-rat or Nehring's blind mole-rat, N. xanthodon

References 

Spalacidae